Olivier Pardini (born 30 July 1985) is a Belgian former professional cyclist, who competed professionally between 2008 and 2018 for the Groupe Gobert.com, /,  and  teams.

Major results

2005
 5th Internationale Wielertrofee Jong Maar Moedig
2006
 5th Memorial Van Coningsloo
 7th Flèche Hesbignonne
2007
 5th Overall Le Triptyque des Monts et Châteaux
 6th Overall Tour du Haut-Anjou
 9th Classic Loire Atlantique
2008
 4th Kattekoers
 4th La Roue Tourangelle
 4th Internationale Wielertrofee Jong Maar Moedig
 8th Overall Le Triptyque des Monts et Châteaux
2009
 4th La Roue Tourangelle
2010
 2nd Memorial Van Coningsloo
2011
 3rd Omloop Het Nieuwsblad Beloften
 4th De Vlaamse Pijl
 7th Memorial Van Coningsloo
 7th Flèche Ardennaise
 8th Zellik–Galmaarden
 10th Grote Prijs Stad Geel
2012
 9th La Roue Tourangelle
2013
 2nd Grand Prix de la Ville de Lillers
 7th Overall Ronde de l'Oise
 10th Gooikse Pijl
2014
 1st Prologue Sibiu Cycling Tour
 2nd Grand Prix de la ville de Pérenchies
 6th Memorial Van Coningsloo
 8th Overall Tour de Normandie
2015
 1st  Overall Ronde van Midden-Nederland
1st Stage 1 (TTT)
 2nd Duo Normand (with Dimitri Claeys)
 3rd Overall Paris–Arras Tour
1st Stage 1 (TTT)
 5th Overall Tour de l'Eurométropole
 8th Overall Tour de Normandie
 8th Binche–Chimay–Binche
 9th Chrono des Nations
 10th Grand Prix Impanis-Van Petegem
2016
 1st  Overall Istrian Spring Trophy
 1st  Overall Circuit des Ardennes
1st Stage 3
 2nd Overall Tour de Normandie
1st Stage 2
 2nd La Roue Tourangelle
 3rd Classic Sud-Ardèche
 4th Overall Driedaagse van West-Vlaanderen
 6th Tour du Finistère
 8th Volta Limburg Classic
2017
 3rd Grote Prijs Marcel Kint
 4th Dwars door het Hageland
 7th Bruges Cycling Classic
 8th Grote Prijs Stad Zottegem
2018
 2nd Internationale Wielertrofee Jong Maar Moedig
 5th Paris–Mantes-en-Yvelines
 9th Paris–Troyes

References

External links

1985 births
Living people
Belgian male cyclists
People from Oupeye
Cyclists from Liège Province